Wat Bakan is a pagoda in Trapeang chorng commune, Bakan District of Pursat Province in Cambodia. It is one of the oldest active pagodas in the country, thought to be at least 800 years old.

References

Buddhist temples in Cambodia
Buildings and structures in Pursat province